Statistics of National Association Foot Ball League in season 1912–13.

League standings
                          GP   W   L   T   Pts
 West Hudson A.A.          18  13   3   2   28
 Paterson True Blues       19  13   3   3   29
 Paterson Wilberforce      19   2   4   3   27
 Jersey A.C.               18  10   5   3   23
 Kearny Scots              17   7   8   2   16
 Newark Caledonians        18   6   9   3   15
 Bronx United              17   7  10   0   14
 Paterson Rangers          17   5  10   2   12
 Newark F.C.               13   3   8   2    8
 Brooklyn F.C.             16   2  14   0    4

References
NATIONAL ASSOCIATION FOOT BALL LEAGUE (RSSSF)

1912-13
1912–13 domestic association football leagues
1912–13 in American soccer